was the twenty-eighth of the fifty-three stations of the Tōkaidō. It is located in what is now the central part of the city of Iwata, Shizuoka Prefecture, Japan. The post station received its name, which means "with a view," because it was the first place from which Mount Fuji could be seen by travelers coming from Kyoto.

History
Mitsuke-juku is located on the left bank of the Tenryū River, but boats generally used the nearby Ōi River, as it had a deeper channel and fewer difficult places to navigate. However, much like Shimada-juku, whenever the Ōi River overflowed, travel through the town became impossible.

In addition to being a post station, Mitsuke-juku also flourished as the entry to Tōtōmi Province's  and as the point at which the Tōkaidō separated with a hime kaidō.

When the Tōkaidō Main Line railway was established, the train station was built to the south of Mitsuke in the village of Nakaizumi. In 1940, Mitsuke and Nakaizumi merged, forming the town of Iwata, which became a city in 1948.

The classic ukiyo-e print by Andō Hiroshige (Hōeidō edition) from 1831–1834 depicts travelers changing boats on a sandbank while crossing the Tenryū River by ferry.

Neighboring post towns
Tōkaidō
Fukuroi-juku - Mitsuke-juku - Hamamatsu-juku

Further reading
Carey, Patrick. Rediscovering the Old Tokaido:In the Footsteps of Hiroshige. Global Books UK (2000). 
Chiba, Reiko. Hiroshige's Tokaido in Prints and Poetry. Tuttle. (1982) 
Taganau, Jilly. The Tokaido Road: Travelling and Representation in Edo and Meiji Japan. RoutledgeCurzon (2004).

References

Stations of the Tōkaidō
Stations of the Tōkaidō in Shizuoka Prefecture